Jónína Bjartmarz (born 23 December 1952 in Reykjavík) is an Icelandic politician and former Minister for the Environment.

External links 
 Biography

Jonina Bjartmarz
1952 births
Living people
Jonina Bjartmarz
Jonina Bjartmarz